Azarakhsh Sarkhun-e-Bandar Abbas Futsal Club was an Iranian futsal club based in Sarkhun.

Season-by-season 
The table below chronicles the achievements of the Club in various competitions.

Honours 
 Iran Futsal's 1st Division
 Runners-up (1): 2014–15
 Iran Futsal's 2nd Division
 Winners (1): 2014

References

External links 
 Official website
 Azarakhsh Fan Club Website

Futsal clubs in Iran
Sport in Bandar Abbas
2000 establishments in Iran
Futsal clubs established in 2000